Andrei Rareș Toader (born 26 May 1997) is a Romanian athlete specialising in the shot put. He won several medals in age category competitions.

His personal bests in the shot put is 21.29 metres outdoors (Brno 2021) and 20.79 m indoors (Bucharest 2020).

He finished second at the 2016 World U20 Championships and was promoted to first after Konrad Bukowiecki was disqualified, but later Toader was disqualified too and stripped for the medal for the use of stimulant higenamine.

Competition record

References

1997 births
Living people
Romanian male shot putters
Athletes (track and field) at the 2014 Summer Youth Olympics
Athletes (track and field) at the 2020 Summer Olympics
Olympic athletes of Romania
Doping cases in athletics